The 1965 Utah State Aggies football team was an American football team that represented Utah State University as an independent during the 1965 NCAA University Division football season. In their third season under head coach Tony Knap, the Aggies compiled an 8–2 record and outscored all opponents by a total of 271 to 136.

The team's statistical leaders included Ron Edwards with 1,095 passing yards, Roy Shivers with 1,138 rushing yards and 96 points scored, and Dave Clark with 579 receiving yards.

Schedule

References

Utah State
Utah State Aggies football seasons
Utah State Aggies football